ALG may refer to:

Airfields
 Advanced Landing Ground, temporary airfields created by the Allies in World War II
 ALG Wormhout, the Advanced Landing Ground home base of 'B' Flight, 665 (AOP) Squadron RCAF, near Dunkirk, France
 Houari Boumediene Airport (IATA airport code ALG), Algiers, Algeria

Enterprises and organizations
 ALG, a company that provides information on future residual values of vehicles; purchased by TrueCar in 2011
 American Laser Games, a former US company 
 Apple Leisure Group, a US travel company
 Association of London Government, a local government association in England
 Art. Lebedev Group, the holding company which owns Art. Lebedev Studio

Science and technology
 Anti-lymphocyte globulin, an immunosuppressive drug
 Application-level gateway, in computer networking

Sports
 A-League, a domestic football league in Australasia
 ALG Spor, a football club in Gaziantep, Turkey

Other uses
 Algeria, IOC country code
 Algonquian languages (ISO 639 code ALG)
 Automatic Language Growth, an approach to language learning/teaching